Will Muir (born 30 October 1995) is an English rugby union player who plays for Bath in the Premiership Rugby.

Early life
Muir holds a degree in mechanical engineering from the University of Northumbria, which he represented in the BUCS Super Rugby competition.

Career
Muir started out his rugby journey playing rugby sevens. He made his debut for England in the Assupol International Sevens tournament in South Africa in 2017.

In 2019 Muir was named England Sevens Player of the Year, the first person to do so in their debut season.

Muir signed for Bath Rugby in August 2020. Following a successful first season with Bath, he signed a new two year contract with the club.

References

External links
Bath Rugby Profile
ESPN Profile
Ultimate Rugby Profile

1995 births
Living people
English rugby union players
Rugby union players from Yorkshire
Rugby union wings